"Airplanes" is a song by American rapper B.o.B featuring American singer Hayley Williams of Paramore. The song was released in April 2010, as the third single from his debut studio album, B.o.B Presents: The Adventures of Bobby Ray. B.o.B co-wrote the song alongside Kinetics & One Love, Alex da Kid, DJ Frank E, and Christine Dominguez. DJ Frank E also co-produced the song with Alex da Kid, Emily Boyle, and Sage Levy. The song was released to iTunes on April 13, 2010, and then to urban radio on April 27, 2010.

"Airplanes" peaked at number two on the US Billboard Hot 100. Outside of the United States, the song topped the charts in New Zealand and the United Kingdom, and peaked within the top ten of the charts in Australia, Canada and the Republic of Ireland. "Airplanes, Part II", the sequel to the song, features new verses from B.o.B, and a verse from fellow American rapper Eminem, while Williams's vocals remained identical to the original. This collaboration led to a Grammy nomination for Best Pop Collaboration with Vocals.

In July of the same year, American rapper Royce da 5'9" used the song's instrumental for a freestyle of the same name, which he released on his album The Bar Exam 3. 

In 2021, it resurfaced as part of a video showing fanart of Mordecai from Regular Show and Twilight Sparkle from My Little Pony: Friendship Is Magic.

Background
"Airplanes" was composed by B.o.B, Jeremy "Kinetics" Dussolliet, Tim "One Love" Sommers, DJ Frank E, Alex "da Kid" Grant, and Christine Dominguez. B.o.B wrote his rap verses, while Kinetics & One Love and Christine Dominguez wrote the chorus sung by Paramore lead singer Hayley Williams, and DJ Frank E & Alex da Kid co-produced the music. The original version had verses written by Lupe Fiasco. Later, the song was given to B.o.B by his label.

Williams' part in the song was explained by herself and B.o.B in different interviews to MTV. Williams said Paramore was on tour when she was given the song and she "liked the part too much" and accepted to appear on it. B.o.B said he has "always been a Hayley fan" and he did not expect a collaboration between them too soon. The duo did not get in the studio together to record the song, they were not together to shoot the music video, and had never even met each other in person, according to Williams. The only time that B.o.B and Williams were able to meet was when they performed "Airplanes" live for the first time together during the 2010 MTV Video Music Awards. The second time the song was performed together live was during Vanderbilt University's Fall 2010 "Commodore Quake" concert in Nashville. During B.o.B.'s performance, Williams came out as a special guest to perform the song.

Music video

A music video was filmed with Williams. B.o.B shot his scenes for the video in April, but Williams was only able to shoot her parts after the end of Paramore's Spring tour, so they were never in the same room during filming. The music video, directed by Hiro Murai, premiered on iTunes on June 15, 2010. The video features several frames of B.o.B rapping his verses in a party setting, on stage, and a room filled with lights and occasional song lyrics while a barefoot Williams sings the hook in a light filled room and walking through photographs.

As of March 2022, the song has 615 million views on YouTube.

The video was nominated for Video of the Year at the 2010 MTV Video Music Awards and the BET Awards of 2011.

Chart performance
"Airplanes" sold 138,000 digital downloads in its first week and debuted at number five on the Billboard Hot Digital Songs chart. The sales made the song debut at number twelve on the Billboard Hot 100, making it B.o.B's highest debut on the chart and Williams' first entry as a solo act. The song continued to rise in the chart and peaked at number two on its sixth week, losing the top position to Usher's "OMG". "Airplanes" entered in numerous Billboard charts, including the Pop Songs and Rap Songs charts, where the song peaked at number two. "Airplanes" had sold over 4 million digital downloads by December 2010, according to Nielsen Soundscan, becoming a bigger success in the United States than his debut single, "Nothin' on You". 

Elsewhere, "Airplanes" was well received. The song debuted at number 62 on the Canadian Hot 100 and reached its current peak position of number two on its ninth week on the chart. In the Australian chart the song debuted at number eighteen and peaked at number two within three weeks on the chart and has been in that position for six non-consecutive weeks. It was in New Zealand where the song got its first number one position. After three weeks of its debut (at number three), the song reached number one and stayed in that position for five consecutive weeks. "Airplanes" later received a Platinum certification in New Zealand, due to its successful chart performance.

In Europe, the song has been released in a number countries, including the United Kingdom, Ireland, the Netherlands, Norway and Sweden. "Airplanes" first appearance in a European chart was in Norway and Ireland and the song peaked within the top ten of the charts in both countries. In the United Kingdom, the song debuted at number 23 on the UK Singles Chart and within five weeks, the song climbed to number three. In the same week, "Airplanes" was number one on the UK R&B Chart. The following week, "Airplanes" climbed to the summit of the chart from downloads alone of 75,892, becoming B.o.B's second chart-topping song in Britain following his debut single "Nothin' on You", which had reached the top of the chart almost two months earlier. The song is the twenty-first most downloaded single in British chart history. "Airplanes" has also peaked at number two in the European Hot 100 chart. "Airplanes" has sold over 1.6 million units in the UK, as of February 2023.

The song was No. 6 on Billboard's Year End Chart.

"Airplanes, Part II"
A sequel to the song, titled "Airplanes, Part II", has two new verses by B.o.B and Eminem and features vocals by Hayley Williams. The song also features a faster beat and chorus by Hayley Williams compared to the original song. The song was produced by Alex da Kid with additional production added by Eminem. Alex da Kid said that the beat for "Airplanes, Part II" was the original beat for the song. In the song, Eminem and B.o.B wonder what would happen if they had not pursued musical careers. B.o.B posted the song on his official Twitter account, claiming he wanted the song to leak from him since the other songs of his album were leaking. When asked how he got to collaborate with Eminem, B.o.B stated:
"Paul Rosenberg played him the Cloud 9 mixtape and it kind of gave him an idea of what my music [sounds like]. Eventually he started playing Eminem more of my stuff and was keeping him updated on my progress and eventually he wanted to get in the studio with me, so that was a gift."

B.o.B, Eminem, and Keyshia Cole (filling in for Hayley Williams) performed the song at the 2010 BET Awards on June 27, 2010, in a medley with Eminem's "Not Afraid". B.o.B performed the song with Eminem on his Home & Home Tour. "Airplanes, Part II" received a Grammy nomination for Best Pop Collaboration With Vocals, although it was not made into a single.

2021 resurgence

Eleven years after the song's release, it resurfaced in July 2021 when it was referenced in a viral TikTok featuring fanart made by user bluedog444 on DeviantArt in 2012. It depicted the characters Twilight Sparkle, the main protagonist of My Little Pony: Friendship Is Magic and Mordecai, one of two main protagonists of Regular Show on a blue background, looking at the sky while sitting next to each other, and crying while wishing to be together. Above them were the lyrics to the song's chorus in black text. The pairing of the two main heroic cartoon characters was dubbed "MordeTwi", a portmanteau of their names. The TikTok featuring the song and art has received 300 million views since its post, spawning an influx of memes. The appeal of the meme comes from the absurdity of the pairing as well as nostalgia due to DeviantArt's primarily adolescent user base. Hayley Williams also responded to the meme the following month in two Tweets after a self-imposed social media break noting her bewilderment.

Charts

Weekly charts

Year-end charts

Decade-end charts

All-time charts

Certifications

The Ready Set version

"Airplanes" was recorded by American electropop artist the Ready Set (Now Onlychild). The song was released as one of the songs in the compilation album, Punk Goes Pop Volume 03.. The song peaked at number 22 on Billboard Rock Digital Song Sales lasting a week on chart. Alternative Press named his version of the song as the 34th best "Top 50 Punk Goes Pop covers of all time".

Charts

See also
List of number-one singles in 2010 (New Zealand)
List of number-one singles from the 2010s (UK)
List of number-one R&B hits of 2010 (UK)

References

2010 singles
2010s ballads
B.o.B songs
Sequel songs
Songs written by B.o.B
Songs written by DJ Frank E
Songs written by One Love (record producer)
Contemporary R&B ballads
Grand Hustle Records singles
Atlantic Records singles
A&M Octone Records singles
Song recordings produced by Alex da Kid
Song recordings produced by DJ Frank E
Number-one singles in Israel
Number-one singles in New Zealand
Number-one singles in Scotland
UK Singles Chart number-one singles
Songs written by Kinetics (rapper)
Songs written by Alex da Kid
2010 songs
Hayley Williams songs
Rap rock songs
Pop-rap songs
Songs about fame
Internet memes introduced in 2021